Önder Çakar is a screenwriter and producer from Turkey.

Studies

As a scriptwriter 
 On Board (Gemide) (1998)
 A Madonna in Laleli (Laleli'de Bir Azize) (1998)
 Offside (Dar Alanda Kısa Paslaşmalar) (2001)
 Maruf (2002)
 Takva: A Man's Fear of God (Takva) (2006)

As a producer 
 On Board (Gemide) (1998)
 A Madonna in Laleli (Laleli'de Bir Azize) (1998)
 Maruf (2002)
 Majority (Çoğunluk) (2010)

As a player 
 Takva: A Man's Fear of God (Takva) (2005)
 Yolda / Rüzgar Geri Getirirse Ali Salim (2005)
 The Edge of Heaven (Yaşamın Kıyısında) Avukat (2007)

Awards 
 Hopeful Young Actor (Yolda / Rüzgar Geri Getirirse) / 17. Ankara Uluslararası Film Festivali 2006.
 Best Screenplay (Takva: A Man's Fear of God) / 43rd Antalya Golden Orange Film Festival 2006.
 Best Screenplay (Offside (2000 film)) / 22. Sinema Yazarları Derneği Ödülleri 2000.

References

External links 
 
 Sinematürk sayfası

Living people
Year of birth missing (living people)
Turkish male screenwriters
Turkish film producers